Tor Fuglset (born 23 April 1951) is a former football midfielder. Fuglset played for the clubs Molde FK, Odda IL, Fredrikstad FK, FK Lyn and FC Den Haag, and Norway national football team before he retired from football in young age. He is the brother of Jan Fuglset.

Club career
Fuglset started his career in his hometown-club Molde FK. In 1968, Molde played in the third tier in Norway, and 17-year-old Fuglset played regularly on Molde's team. Molde met Fredrikstad FK, the club where Tor Fuglset's brother Jan Fuglset where playing, in the quarter-final of 1968 Norwegian Football Cup. The younger brother Tor scored Molde's first goal, while the elder brother Jan provided the final goal in a match Fredrikstad won 4–3.

Fuglset had a short spell in Odda IL, before moving to Fredrikstad FK in 1969, where he scored six goals in his first nine league-games. He scored one goal in the 1969 Cup Final, which Fredrikstad lost against Strømsgodset IF. He played for Fredrikstad for two seasons, and scored eight goals in twenty-seven matches before he moved on to FK Lyn.

The midfielder made his debut for Lyn on 26 April 1971, and scored two goals when Lyn won 7–1 against SK Frigg. In the two seasons Fuglset played for Lyn, he played twenty-six league-matches and scored nine goals, and two matches against Sporting in the 1971–72 European Cup Winners' Cup.

Fuglset moved on to the Dutch club FC Den Haag in 1973, where he experienced big success. In fact, big European clubs was ready to sign Fuglset, but he had to retire due to a heart defect.

In 1975, after his retirement, Fuglset helped 17-year-old Roger Albertsen to get a professional contract with his old club FC Den Haag.

He made a comeback for Molde FK in 1979 and helped them earn promotion to the First Division.

International career
Tor Fuglset was capped 9 times for Norway, scoring two goals, and made his debut against Sweden in September 1970 in a game that Sweden won 4–2, but after the match the Norwegian media agreed that Fuglset made the best national team debut since Roald "Kniksen" Jensen in 1960.

He also played for five matches for Norway national under-19 football team and scored three goals in six matches for Norway national under-21 football team

Honours
Fredrikstad FK
Norwegian Football Cup:  Runner-up 1969

FK Lyn
Norwegian First Division:  Runner-up 1971

References

External links 
 

Living people
1951 births
People from Molde
Norwegian footballers
Norway international footballers
Norwegian expatriate footballers
Eliteserien players
Expatriate footballers in the Netherlands
Molde FK players
Fredrikstad FK players
Lyn Fotball players
ADO Den Haag players
Norwegian expatriate sportspeople in the Netherlands
Association football midfielders
Sportspeople from Møre og Romsdal